Jacob Taubes (25 February 1923 – 21 March 1987) was a sociologist of religion, philosopher, and scholar of Judaism.

Taubes was born into an old rabbinical family.  He was married to the writer Susan Taubes. He obtained his doctorate in 1947 for a thesis on "Occidental Eschatology" and initially taught religious studies and Jewish studies in the United States at Harvard, Columbia and Princeton University.

From 1965 he was professor of Jewish studies and hermeneutics at the Free University of Berlin. He has influenced many contemporary thinkers such as Giorgio Agamben, Susan Sontag, Avital Ronell, Marshall Berman, Babette Babich, Aleida and Jan Assmann, Amos Funkenstein and Peter Sloterdijk.

Taubes' books include Occidental Eschatology [Stanford UP, 2009] and The Political Theology of Paul [Stanford UP, 2004].

References
 Babette Babich, "Ad Jacob Taubes", Debra B. Bergoffen, Babich, and David B. Allison, eds., New Nietzsche Studies: Nietzsche and the Jews. 7, 3 & 4, (Fall 2007/Winter 2008): v-x.
 Joshua Robert Gold, "Jacob Taubes: 'Apocalypse From Below'", Telos 134 (Spring 2006): 140–56.
Lilla, Mark (17 April 2022), "The Man Who Made Thinking Erotic" (a review of Professor of Acocalypse: The Many Lives of Jacob Taubes by Jerry Z. Muller), The New York Times . Retrieved 11 June 2022.
 Nitzan Lebovic, "Jacob Taubes: Looking into the Beauty of the Night", H-Judaic (Spring, 2011):  www.h-net.org/reviews/showpdf.php?id=29694
 Jerry Z. Muller, "Professor of Apocalypse: The Many Lives of Jacob Taubes", Princeton University Press, 2022.

1923 births
1987 deaths
20th-century Austrian philosophers
German Jewish theologians
German sociologists
Jewish philosophers
Jewish sociologists
Sociologists of religion
Writers from Vienna
Academic staff of the Free University of Berlin
Historians of Jews and Judaism
Columbia University faculty
20th-century Austrian historians
German male non-fiction writers
20th-century male writers
Political theologians
Carl Schmitt scholars
Austrian expatriates in the United States
Austrian emigrants to Germany